The Wodonga Rail Bypass, was a Victorian state government project in regional Victoria Australia, to provide a new double-track railway bypass around the northern city of Wodonga. The 5.5-kilometre bypass eliminated 11 level crossings.

Funding
In December 2000 the federal government committed $20 million for the bypass project, In the 2006/07 budget, the Victorian government set aside $55 million to fund the bypass. In November 2006, the Government of Victoria came to an agreement with Pacific National to buy back the company's lease on the state's rail network, which enabled them to go ahead with the project.

Cost
By January 2007 the estimated cost of the project had risen to $125 million, and the start of work on the bypass was delayed. The project was part of a $501 million upgrade of the North East line.

Construction
Work finally began on the bypass in September 2008, with the Premier of Victoria John Brumby and Federal Infrastructure Minister Anthony Albanese turning the first sod. There were delays in October 2008, when the Dhudhuroa peoples told Federal Minister for Environment Peter Garrett that the works would be likely to desecrate and deface six culturally significant sites, areas and objects.

On 23 July 2010 the new rail bypass was opened, and the original line through Wodonga decommissioned. On 25 June 2011, the new Wodonga railway station opened.

References

Railway lines in Victoria (Australia)
Railroad cutoffs
Standard gauge railways in Australia
Wodonga
Bypasses in Australia